Neurons to Nirvana is a 2013 documentary film by Canadian filmmaker Oliver Hockenhull.  The film examines the evidence for the therapeutic benefits of psychedelic drugs.  The production company crowdfunded marketing and distribution through a successful Kickstarter campaign that raised more than $35,000.

Two versions of the film were released, a director's cut and an educational edition.  The director's cut premiered at the Vancouver Film Festival in 2013 and is titled From Neurons to Nirvana: The Great Medicines and is 108 minutes.  The popular released version is titled: Neurons to Nirvana: Understanding Psychedelic Medicines and runs 69 minutes

The film features interviews with Gabor Maté, Dennis McKenna, Rick Doblin, Charles Grob, Jeremy Narby, Stanislav Grof, David Nutt, Julie Holland, David Healy, Michael Mithoefer, David Nichols, Amanda Feilding, Stephen Ross, Ralph Metzner, Gillian Maxwell, Manuel Schoch, Michael Winkelman, William Richards, Kathleen Harrison, Roland R. Griffiths, Wade Davis, Ingrid Pacey, and Chris Bennett.

The shorter version of the film also features scenes from Ben Ridgway's experimental animated film Continuum Infinitum.

References

Further reading
 Bahirwani, Krishna (July 21, 2014). Neurons to Nirvana; phish 'n' chips.  Daily News & Analysis. Retrieved November 15, 2014.
 Wysockam, Natalia (October 17, 2013). From Neurons to Nirvana: traitements alternatifs. Métro. Retrieved November 15, 2014.

External links
 Mangusta Productions
 Director's site
 108 minute version
 

2013 documentary films
Documentary films about drugs
Psychedelic drug research
Canadian documentary films
2013 films
2010s English-language films
2010s Canadian films